City Of Light is the sixth solo album by American composer Bill Laswell, released on July 29, 1997 by Sub Rosa.

Track listing

Personnel 
Adapted from the City Of Light liner notes.
Musicians
John Balance – sound collage (2)
Lori Carson – vocals
Peter Christopherson – sound collage (2)
Trilok Gurtu – tabla (1)
Tetsu Inoue – sound collage (3)
Bill Laswell – sound collage (1, 4), producer, recording
Technical personnel
Robert Musso – engineering

Release history

References

External links 
 

1997 albums
Bill Laswell albums
Albums produced by Bill Laswell
Sub Rosa Records albums